Cyprinion microphthalmum is a species of ray-finned fish in the genus Cyprinion. This species may be a synonym of Cyprinion watsoni. If valid it is found in Iran, Pakistan, Afghanistan and the Arabian peninsula.

Cyprinion microphthalmum microphthalmum is a subspecies of Cyprinion microphthalmum.

References

External links 
 
 

microphthalmum
Fish described in 1880